Jonathan Dean Harvey (3 May 1939 – 4 December 2012) was a British composer. He held teaching positions at universities and music conservatories in Europe and the USA.

Life
Harvey was born in Sutton Coldfield, and studied at St John's College, Cambridge, eventually obtaining a PhD. He also took private lessons with Erwin Stein and Hans Keller on the advice of Benjamin Britten. In 1969, he took up a Harkness Fellowship at Princeton University. In the 1980s, Harvey produced music at IRCAM after receiving an invitation from Pierre Boulez to work there.

At IRCAM, Harvey produced works such as Speakings, a composition for large orchestra and electronics, in collaboration with sound artist and composer Gilbert Nouno and researchers Arshia Cont and Grégoire Carpentier. The concept of the piece was to "make an orchestra speak". IRCAM is known for speech analysis and in this piece, special technology was developed to allow the analysis of speech to be realized in an orchestral context, using complex algorithms which can process multiple combinations possible in an orchestra setting. The program Orchidée computed such analyses and provided orchestrations for the composer.

From 2005 to 2008, Harvey held the post of Composer in Association with the BBC Scottish Symphony Orchestra.

In 2009, he was Composer in Residence at the Huddersfield Contemporary Music Festival. He died, aged 73, in Lewes, from motor neurone disease.

Speakings received six votes in a 2017 Classic Voice poll of the greatest works of art music since 2000. In 2019, writers for The Guardian ranked Harvey's String Quartet No. 4 the eighth greatest work of classical music in the same period.

Writings
1975. The Music of Stockhausen: An Introduction. Berkeley and Los Angeles: University of California Press. .
1976. "Inner Light (3)". The Musical Times 117, no. 1596 (February): 125–127.
1981. Ferneyhough. London: Edition Peters. (on Brian Ferneyhough)
1983. "New Directions: A Manifesto". Soundings: A Music Journal 11 (Winter): 2–13.
1999a. Music and Inspiration, edited by Michael Downes. London and New York: Faber and Faber. .
1999b. In Quest of Spirit: Thoughts on Music. The Bloch Lectures. With compact disc sound recording. Berkeley and Los Angeles: University of California Press. . French edition, as Pensées sur la musique: la quête de l'esprit, translated by Mireille Tansman Zanuttini in collaboration with and with an introduction by Danielle Cohen-Levinas. Paris: L'Harmattan, 2007. . Spanish edition, as Música e inspiración, translated by Carme Castells. Barcelona: Global Rhythm Press, 2008; .
2007, with Jean-Claude Carrière. Circles of Silence. The Cahiers Series no. 3. [Paris]: Center for Writers & Translators, The Arts Arena, American University of Paris; Lewes [England]: Sylph Editions. . (on the opera Wagner Dream)

Selected works

Dialogue and Song for cello and piano (1965/1977)
Four Images after Yeats for piano (1969)
Piano Trio (1971)
I love the Lord, motet (1976)
String Quartet No. 1 (1977)
Cantata: IV: Ludus amoris: for speaker, soprano & tenor soli, SATB, and orchestra (1977), 
O Jesu Nomen Dulce for choir (1979)
Mortuos Plango, Vivos Voco, computer-manipulated concrete sounds (pre-recorded octophonic tape), for tape (1980)
Mythic Figures (1980)
Bhakti for 15 players and quadrophonic tape (1982)
Curve with Plateaux for solo cello (1982)
Flight-Elegy for violin and piano (1983–89)
Nataraja for flute, piccolo and piano (1983)
Nachtlied for soprano, piano and tape (1984)
Come Holy Ghost for choir (1984)
Ricercare una Melodia for solo trumpet/cello/flute/oboe/trombone with tape delay system (1984)
Song Offerings for soprano and chamber ensemble of 8 players (1985)
Forms of Emptiness for choir (1986)
God is our Refuge for choir and organ (1986)
Madonna of Winter and Spring for orchestra, synthesizer and electronics (1986)
Lauds for choir and solo cello (1987)
From Silence for soprano, 6 players and tape (1988)
String Quartet No. 2 (1988)
Three Sketches for solo cello (1989)
Ritual Melodies for quadrophonic tape (1989–90)
Cello Concerto (1990)
Fantasia for organ (1991)
Serenade in Homage to Mozart for wind ensemble of 10 players (1991)
Scena for violin and chamber ensemble of 9 players (1992)
Lotuses for flute quartet (1992)
You (1992)
Chant for solo cello (or solo viola) (1992–94)
The Riot for flute, piccolo, bass clarinet and piano (1993)
One Evening... for soprano, mezzo, soprano, chamber ensemble of 8 players, 2 technicians and electronics (1993–94)
The Angels for choir (1994)
Tombeau de Messiaen for piano and tape (1994)
Advaya for cello, electronic keyboard and electronics (1994)
Dum Transisset Sabbatum for choir (1995)
String Quartet No. 3 (1995)
Percussion Concerto (1997)
Sufi Dance for solo guitar (1997)
Wheel of Emptiness for chamber ensemble of 16 players (1997)
Ashes Dance Back for choir and electronics (1997)
Death of Light/Light of Death for chamber ensemble of 5 players after Grunewald's Crucifixion in the Isenheim Altarpiece (1998)
Tranquil Abiding for chamber orchestra (1998)
Valley of Aosta for 13 players and electronics (1998)
Marahi for unaccompanied choir (1999)
The Summer Cloud's Awakening for choir, flute, cello and electronics (2001)
Vers for piano (2000)
Jubilus for viola and chamber ensemble (2003)
String Quartet No. 4 with live electronics (2003)
String Trio (2004)
Body Mandala for orchestra (2006)
Wagner Dream, opera (2007)
Other Presences for trumpet and electronics (2008)
Imaginings for cello and live electronics
Philia's Dream for cello and synthesizer
Weltethos , an oratorio, for speaker, choir, children's chorus and orchestra (2011), commissioned by the Berliner Philharmoniker
"Cirrus Light" for clarinet (2012) 9min

References

Further reading

 Alcorn, P. M. (1992). Perspectives of Electroacoustic Music: A Critical Study of the Electroacoustic Music of Jonathan Harvey, Denis Smalley and Trevor Wishart. Ph.D. diss. Durham: University of Durham.
 Beaumont, Adrian (1998). "Expectation and Interpretation in the Reception of New Music: A Case Study". In Composition—Performance—Reception: Studies in the Creative Process, edited by Wyndham Thomas, 93–104. Aldershot: Ashgate. .
 Bossis, Bruno (2017). "Les premiers contacts de Jonathan Harvey avec la technologie et la Set Theory, vers une pensée musicale à la fois structuraliste et spiritualiste." Nuove Musiche no. 3: 29–44.
 Bossis, Bruno (2004). "Mortuos plango, vivos voco de Jonathan Harvey ou le miroir de la spiritualité". Musurgia: Analyse et pratique musicales 11, nos. 1–2 (Images de la Voix): 119–144.
 Bowling, Irene Ruth (1989). "British Piano Music Since 1945: A Selected Survey". DMA diss. Seattle: University of Washington.
 Brech, Martha (1993). Analyse elektroakustischer Musik mit Hilfe von Sonagrammen. Europäische Hochschulschriften XXXVI: Musikwissenschaft, Nr. 118. Frankfurt am Main: Peter Lang. .
 Brech, Martha (1999). "Im Spannungsfeld zwischen Archaik und Moderne: Riten im Electronic Listening und der Elektroakustischen Musik". In Musik und Ritual: Fünf Kongreßbeiträge, zwei freie Beiträge und ein Seminarbericht, edited by Barbara Barthelmes and Helga de la Motte-Haber, 89–109. Veröffentlichungen des Instituts für Neue Musik und Musikerziehung Darmstadt, no. 39. Mainz: Schott. .
 Brown, David (1968). "Jonathan Harvey". The Musical Times 109, no. 1507 (September) 808–810.
 Denut, Éric (2002). "Chemins de traverse entre l'un et le multiple: Une introduction à l'œuvre de Jonathan Harvey". Musica falsa: Musique, art, philosophie, no. 16 (Fall): 36–39.
 Donin, Nicolas (2006). "Spatialization as a Compositional Tool and Individual Access to Music in the Future". Circuit: Musiques contemporaines 16, no. 3: 75–81.
 Felici, Candida (2017). "Spectral thinking as spiritual search ...und electronics ist auch dabei: Jonathan Harvey's Tombeau de Messiaen, String Quartet No. 4 and Speakings." Nuove Musiche no. 3: 119–153.
 Foreman, Ronald Lewis Edmund (ed.) (1975). British Music Now: A Guide to the Work of Younger Composers. London: Elek.
 Fuchs, Jörn Florian (2007). "Buddhistische Träume aus Licht und Elektronik: Jonathan Harveys Wagner Dream am Grand Théâtre de Luxembourg uraufgeführt (6. Juni 2007)". Wagnerspectrum 3, no. 2:185–186.
 Γεωργάκη, Αναστασία [Geōrgakī, Anastasia] (2004). "Η μεταφυσική διάσταση της συνθετικής τραγουδιστής φωνής στο έργο Mortuos Plango-Vivos Voco (J. Harvey, 1980)" [The Metaphysical Dimension of the Synthetic Singing Voice in the Work Mortuos plango, vivos voco (J. Harvey, 1980)]. Polyfōnia, no. 4 (Spring): 57–92.
 Griffiths, Paul (1984). "Three Works by Jonathan Harvey: The Electronic Mirror". Contemporary Music Review 1, no. 1 (Musical Thought at IRCAM) 87–109.
 Griffiths, Paul (1985). New Sounds, New Personalities: British Composers of the 1980s in Conversation with Paul Griffiths. London: Faber and Faber. .
 Groot, Rokus de (2002). "De klank van het oosten: Transformaties in de westerse klassieke muziek onder invloed van concepten over het oosten—Klank en spiritualiteit". Krisis: Tijdschrift voor empirische filosofie 3, no. 4:96–105.
 Halász, Péter (1994). "Beszélgetés Jonathan Harvey angol zeneszerzővel" [Interview with the English Composer Jonathan Harvey]. Muzsika 37, no. 9 (September): 33–36.
 Jenkins, Matthew (2006). "A Search for Emptiness: An Interview with Jonathan Harvey". Perspectives of New Music 44, no. 2 (Summer): 220–231.
 Johnson, Julian M. (2003a). "Precarious Rapture: The Recent Music of Jonathan Harvey". In Aspects of British Music of the 1990s, edited by Peter O'Hagan, 63–84. Burlington, Vermont: Ashgate. .
 Johnson, Julian M. (2003b). "A  Interview with Jonathan Harvey". In Aspects of British Music of the 1990s, edited by Peter O'Hagan, 119–129. Burlington, Vermont: Ashgate. .
 Joos, Maxime (2002). "'La cloche et la vague': Introduction à la musique spectrale—Tristan Murail et Jonathan Harvey". Musica falsa: Musique, art, philosophie, no. 16 (Fall): 30–31.
 Josipovici, Gabriel (1989). "Music and Literary Form". Contemporary Music Review 5 (Music and Text): 65–75.
 Kennedy, Michael (2006), The Oxford Dictionary of Music, 985 pages, 
 Palmer, John (1998a). "Jonathan Harvey's Inquest of Love: The Redemptive Spirit of Art". 20th-Century Music 5, no. 5 (May): 8–11.
 Palmer, John (1998b). "A Conversation with Jonathan Harvey". 20th-Century Music 5, no. 8 (August): 1–8.
 Palmer, John (1998c). "An Introduction to Jonathan Harvey's Bhakti". 20th-Century Music 5, no. 11 (November): 6–15.
 Palmer, John (1998d). "Structural Strategies and Pitch Gestalt in Jonathan Harvey's Bhakti". 20th-Century Music 5, no. 12 (December): 4–24.
 Palmer, John (2001). Jonathan Harvey's Bhakti for Chamber Ensemble and Electronics: Serialism, Electronics, and Spirituality. Studies in the History and Interpretation of Music 77. Lewiston, New York : Edwin Mellen Press. .
 Pavia, Marcela (2017). "Tombeau de Messiaen, ovvero del dualismo armonia/timbro." Nuove Musiche no. 3: 83–117.
 Samson, Jim (1981). "Nowe tendencje w angielskiej muzyce orkiestrowej" [New Trends in British Orchestral Music]. Muzyka: Kwartalnik poświęcony historii i teorii muzyki 26, no. 2:3–21.
 Seo, Juri (2013). Jonathan Harvey's String Quartets. DMA diss. University of Illinois at Urbana-Champaign.
 Seo, Juri (2017). "Jonathan Harvey's String Quartets Nos. 1 and 2." Nuove Musiche no. 3: 45–81.
 Smalley, Denis (1993). "Defining Transformations". Interface: Journal of New Music Research 22, no. 4 (November): 279–300.
 Smith, Pamela (1989). "Towards the Spiritual: The Electroacoustic Music of Jonathan Harvey". Contact, no. 34 (Fall): 11–16.
 Solomos, Makis (1998). "L'identité du son: Notes croisées sur Jonathan Harvey et Gérard Grisey". Résonance: Semestriel d'information musicale, no. 13 (March): 12–15.
 Sykes, Claire (2003). "Spiritual Spectralism: The Music of Jonathan Harvey". Musicworks: Explorations in Sound, no. 87 (Fall): 30–37.
 Thompson, Daniel N. (1999). "Beyond Duality: Stasis, Silence, and Vertical Listening". Current Musicology, nos. 67–68 (Fall–Winter): 487–517.
 Vandenheede, Jan (1992). "Jonathan Harvey's Ritual Melodies". Interface: Journal of New Music Research 21, no. 2) 149–183.
 Whittall, Arnold (1999). Jonathan Harvey. London: Faber. . French edition, as Jonathan Harvey, translated by Peter Szendy, and Éric De Visscher. Paris: L'Harmattan, 2000. .
 Whittall, Arnold (2001). "Harvey, Jonathan (Dean)". The New Grove Dictionary of Music and Musicians, 2nd edition, edited by Stanley Sadie and John Tyrrell. London: Macmillan.
 Whittall, Arnold (2017). "The Essence of Jonathan Harvery." Nuove Musiche no. 3: 13–27.
 Winter, John (1985). "Jonathan Harvey's Church Music". Composer, no. 84 (Spring): 16–21.

External links
Jonathan Harvey website

Jonathan Harvey Interview by Daniel Jaffé. Originally published in Classic CD, July 1999: republished www.compositiontoday.com
Vanessa Thorpe: Composer Jonathan Harvey calls for amplified classical music to attract young audiences The Observer 5 September 2010
Chance Music with Jonathan Harvey Interview by Bob Shingleton. Future Radio, 5 September 2010
Composing Oneself University of St Andrews 600th Anniversary Composition Competition 14 October 2010

1939 births
2012 deaths
20th-century classical composers
21st-century classical composers
Deaths from motor neuron disease
English classical composers
Alumni of St John's College, Cambridge
Fellows of St John's College, Cambridge
Princeton University alumni
Academics of Imperial College London
Academics of the University of Sussex
People from Sutton Coldfield
English opera composers
Male opera composers
English male classical composers
20th-century English composers
20th-century British male musicians
21st-century British male musicians
Neurological disease deaths in England